Gilbert "Gil" Johnson (December 4, 1923 – July 10, 1999) was an American football quarterback who played professionally in the All-America Football Conference.

Early life and high school
Johnson was born and grew up in Tyler, Texas and attended John Tyler High School.

College career
Johnson played four seasons for the Southern Methodist University Mustangs. He was the team's starting quarterback as a junior and as a senior after sharing passing duties with Doak Walker as a sophomore. In his first year as a starter he passed for 565 yards with eight touchdowns and five interceptions as SMU won the 1947 Southwest Conference championship. As a senior, Johnson led the conference and was sixth in the nation with 1,026 passing yards on 78-for-128 passing with 13 touchdowns and nine interceptions as the Mustangs went 9–1–1 and repeated as SWC champions.

Professional career
Johnson was selected in the 11th round of the 1948 NFL Draft by the Philadelphia Eagles. He ultimately missed the 1948 season after he did not agree to a contract with the Eagles and ultimately signed with the New York Yankees of the All-America Football Conference. He played in nine games for the Yankees, completing 12 of 36 pass attempts for 179 yards and five interceptions with no touchdowns. Johnson was drafted a second time by the Eagles with the last pick in the 1950 AAFC dispersal draft after the league folded and was subsequently given to the Detroit Lions, who released him before the beginning of the season.  Johnson was signed by the Eagles in 1951 but was cut during training camp.

References

1923 births
1999 deaths
Players of American football from Texas
American football quarterbacks
SMU Mustangs football players
Philadelphia Eagles players
New York Yankees (AAFC) players
Detroit Lions players
Sportspeople from Tyler, Texas